Giuseppe Caracciolo was an Italian cinematographer, who worked on more than forty films during his career which stretched from the silent era into the Post-War years. In 1944, he was employed on Vittorio De Sica's The Children Are Watching Us.

Selected filmography
 Sun (1929)
 The White Ship (1941)
 Men on the Sea Floor (1941)
 Giarabub (1942)
 The Children Are Watching Us (1944)
 The Tyrant of Padua (1946)
 The Emperor of Capri (1949)
 Toto Looks for a House (1949)
 Red Seal (1950)
 Malavita (1951)
 Red Moon (1951)

References

External links

Bibliography
 Cardullo, Bert. In Search of Cinema: Writings on International Film Art.   McGill-Queen's Press, 2004.

1892 births
Year of death unknown
Italian cinematographers
Film people from Naples